Christopher Donovan (born August 8, 2000) is an American professional soccer player who plays as a forward for the Philadelphia Union of Major League Soccer.

Career

High school
Donovan was named Gatorade Player of the Year in Pennsylvania in 2018. Previously, Donovan had played four years of varsity soccer at Conestoga High School, where he was a three-time First Team All-Main Line player, leading Conestoga to a Central League championship in each of his last three seasons, and was named the league's MVP as a senior. Donovan was also a two-time state champion in 2016 and 2017. He led the team in scoring in each of his final three years, scoring 56 goals as a senior in 2017, which earned him First Team All-State and All-American honors as a senior, and was named the Philadelphia Daily News Local Player of the Year.

College
In 2018, Donovan attended Drexel University to play college soccer. In four seasons with the Dragons, Donovan made 60 appearances, scoring 30 goals and tallying 13 assists. He also earned numerous accolades in his senior year, including the Philadelphia Inquirer Men's Soccer Performer of the Year, Chris Jones Philly Soccer Six Player of the Year, Colonial Athletic Association Player of the Year, and the United Soccer Coaches Atlantic Region First Team.

While at college, Donovan also played with West Chester United. He made two regular season appearances and one play-off appearance for the team during their 2019 season in the NPSL, scoring three goals. In 2020 West Chester moved to the USL League Two, but the season was cancelled due to the COVID-19 pandemic. He made nine appearances for the club in 2021, scoring six goals and adding three assists.

Professional
On January 11, 2022, Donovan was drafted 68th overall in the 2022 MLS SuperDraft by Columbus Crew. He was let go by Columbus during their preseason. He subsequently signed with MLS Next Pro side Philadelphia Union II on February 1, 2022, ahead of the league's inaugural season. On June 17, 2022, Donovan was signed by Philadelphia Union, and joined the club's Major League Soccer roster. Philadelphia sent Chicago Fire FC $50,000 of General Allocation Money to move up to the top spot of the MLS Waiver Order to select him.

References

External links
 

2000 births
Living people
American soccer players
Association football forwards
Columbus Crew draft picks
Drexel Dragons men's soccer players
National Premier Soccer League players
People from Paoli, Pennsylvania
Philadelphia Union players
Philadelphia Union II players
Major League Soccer players
MLS Next Pro players
Soccer players from Pennsylvania
USL League Two players